Emili Salut i Payà (November 13, 1918 - May 16, 1982) was a Catalan trumpeter and composer.

Biography 
Emili Salut i Payà was born in Barcelona.

Emili Salut attended the Municipal School of Barcelona, where he studied violin with the teachers Sainz de la Maza and Costa and piano with Joseph Climent. But his passion was composition. Later, he took a great interest in the trumpet, so he started lessons with Lluís Rovira and became part of ensembles in the Avenue of Parallel until 1936, when the Spanish Civil War broke out.

In 1939, he went to the USSR, where he studied to become a pilot. Between 1940 and 1941, he was a musician of the Mijail Lipski Orchestra in Moscow. In 1941, when German troops entered Russian territories, he was locked up for eight years in prisons and concentration camps. When he was released in 1948, he continued with his music studies.

He married his first wife, Isida Filippova. They had two daughters, Francesca and Violeta.

In 1957 he was able to return to Spain and live in Madrid and Barcelona. He worked at the Radio Nacional de España and then as a teacher at the Assimil Academy.

Compositions

Chamber music 
 Collection of six Cànons a 4 and 2 voices, Op. 8 (1953 - 1976), for strings
 Guerras civiles de Granada, Op. 13 (1957), for violin and piano
 Solo de concierto, for voice, violin and piano

Voice and piano 
 Agraint un clavell (1982)
 Invierno (1946), written in the concentration camp
 Recuerdos, memories from the concentration camp

Piano 
 Canone, Op. 53 (1980)
 Elegie, Op. 36 (1940)
 Estudi núm. 1: Satànic (1953)
 Preludio, Op. 53 (1976)
 Recoup, Op. 35 (1970)
 Romanza (1947)
 Sonata núm. 1 (1947)
 12 Valsos per a piano, Op. 15 (1945 - 1971)

Organ 
 Fugueta, d'introducció i comiat per a una cerimònia nupcial, Op. 25

Choir 
 Canción Yalta, Op. 9, Russian text
 El cargol, Op. 1 (1978)

Cobla 
 Els brivalls del barri, Op. 3 (1965), sardana for choir and cobla (the traditional music ensemble of Catalonia)
 El cargol, Op. 3 (1979), for choir and cobla
 En Pere Gallarí, Op. 3 (1976), for choir and cobla
 Un pont de cobre l'altre, Op. 3 (1963), for choir and cobla
 Remei, Op. 3 (1962), for choir and cobla
 La vall, Op. 3 (1965), for choir and cobla

Orchestra 
 Introducció i comiat per a una cerimònia nupcial, Op. 25 (1963)
 Kalinka, Op. 48
 Retaule nadalench, Op. 39 (1962)
 Romanza, Op. 49 (1962)
 Rondó per al tema de Krasnii sarafan, Op. 47
 Santa Eulària, esbós poemàtich (1976)
 Suite amussette, Op. 35
 Suite Tártara núm. 3 (1953)
 Tonadilla y Copla, Op. 42 (1969), dedicated to Russian people. The location of this work is unknown

Band 
 Retaule nadalench, Op. 39 (1962)

Ballet 
 El Circo, suite for symphony orchestra
 Suite lirique, Op. 11
 Werther, Op. 16 (1950 - 1978)

Arrangements 
 Jota aragonesa, of Glimka, instrumentated for band (1962)
 Ave Maria, of Franz Schubert, instrumentated for soloist, choir and orchestra

Jazz 
 Abschor lied
 Aufwiedersehen
 Foxbrush, foxtrot (1947)
 Stormbound
 Foxtrot
 Glaspliter, intermezzo
 Ich will das immer Frühling sein soll
 A little house on Michigan Sea
 Mutter liebe
 Sombrero cordobés (1947)

Jazz arrangements 
 Love is a many-splendored thing, of Sammy Fain, arranged for trumpet
 La sombra de tu sonrisa, of J. Mandel i P. Webster, arranged for trumpet
 Blue Skies, arranged for piano

References

Further reading 
 Memòries, Emili Salut i Payà, Biblioteca de Catalunya. Topographics: M 4900 to M 4948. [Retrieved: 8 March 2014]

External links 

 Personal papers of Emili Salut in the Biblioteca de Catalunya

Spanish trumpeters
Composers from Catalonia
Spanish classical composers
Spanish male classical composers
20th-century classical composers
1918 births
1982 deaths
20th-century Spanish musicians
20th-century trumpeters
20th-century Spanish male musicians